The Kerala State Human Rights Commission was constituted on 11 December 1998 with the appointment of the first Chairperson Justice M.M. Pareed Pillay, a former Chief Justice Kerala High Court along with Dr.  S. Balaraman and Shri. T.K. Wilson as supporting members by notification S.R.O No. 1066/1998 Dt: 11-12-98. The former Chief Justice of Kerala High Court  Justice Antony Dominic is the present chairperson. The Chairperson and members are appointed by the Kerala Governor.

SHRC has chairman and two members. Chairman should be retired chief justice or judge of High Court and members should be a serving or retired judge of HC or district judge with 7 years experience and a person of knowledge or practical experience in field of human rights. It shall inquire into violation of human rights in respect of matters specified in state list and concurrent list. But if NHRC or any other statutory commission has already inquired then the SHRC doesn't investigate into it. Objectives and duties are same as NHRC.

A sitting judge of HC or sitting district judge can be appointed only after recommendations of CJ of high court. Once the members cease to occupy office they aren't eligible for any appointment under central or state government. Members are not eligible for reappointment subject to age criteria. Term is 70 years of age or three years.

The Chairperson and members of the Kerala HRC are appointed by the Governor, on the recommendation of a committee consisting of:

 The Chief Minister (chairperson)
 The Home Minister
 The Leader of the Opposition in the legislative assembly
 The Speaker of the legislative assembly

Functions
According to TPHRA, 1993 (with amendment act 2006), the commission is entitled to perform any of the following functions:

 Autonomously investigate on a petition filed by a victim or any person on his/her behalf as a complaint of
 Violation of human rights and instigation or
 Negligence in the prevention of such violations by any public servant.
 Get involved in any proceeding under allegation or violation of human right pending before a court with the approval of that court.
 Inspect living conditions of the inmates in any jail or any other institution under the control of the State Government where persons are detained or lodged for purposes of treatment, reformation or protection.
 Review the safeguards provided in the constitution or any other law for the time it is in force to ensure the protection of human rights
 Review the factors that inhibit the enjoyment of human rights
 Undertake and promote research and awareness programs in the field of human rights
 Promote human right awareness through literacy campaigns, publications, seminars etc. for the protection and safeguards available under human rights practices.
 Encourage involvement of Non-Government Organizations and individuals for expansion work in the field of human rights awareness.
 Perform any other functions that may be considered necessary for the promotion of human rights.
 
It is clarified that though the commission has the power to inquire in violation of human rights (or instigation thereof) by a public servant; Instances where the human rights are violated by any individual citizen then the commission can intervene, if there is failure or negligence on the part of a public and servant to prevent any such violation.

References

Human rights organisations based in India
Human rights
1988 establishments in Kerala
Organisations based in Thiruvananthapuram
Government agencies established in 1988